Walk On By may refer to:

"Walk On By (song)", first recorded by Dionne Warwick and covered by several other artists
 "Walk On By" (Leroy Van Dyke song)
"Walk On By", a b-side song by Britney Spears from the Oops!... I Did It Again single "Stronger" and covered by Gareth Gates
"Walk On By", a song by Cake from Prolonging the Magic
"Walk On By", a song by Fat Joe from Don Cartagena
"Walk On By", a song by Logic from Young Sinatra: Welcome To Forever
"Walk On By", a song by Miss Kittin & The Hacker from First Album
"Walk On By", a song by Young Deenay from Birth
Walk On By: The Story of Popular Song, a BBC documentary series that was nominated for a 2002 British Academy Television Award
Walk On By (album), a 1966 album by jazz organist Brother Jack McDuff
Walk On By (Sybil album), 1989